"Shakira: Bzrp Music Sessions, Vol. 53" (alternatively known as "Out of Your League" in English and "" in Spanish) is a song by Argentine producer Bizarrap and Colombian singer-songwriter Shakira. It was released on 11 January 2023, through Dale Play Records, after a music video released on Bizarrap's YouTube channel – part of his popular Bzrp Music Sessions series – was released on the same day.

A diss track taking aim at Shakira's ex-partner, footballer Gerard Piqué, as well as a women's empowerment anthem, the song reportedly "broke the internet", breaking various records for viewership and listenership for a Latin song, as well as having measurable market impact on the brands mentioned in the lyrics. The song reached number one in 16 countries as well as on Billboard Hot Latin Songs, and was Shakira's first top-ten single on the US Billboard Hot 100 since "Beautiful Liar" (2007). It has been praised musically for its catchy sound and lyrics as well as for Bizarrap's contribution in giving Shakira a new sound.

Background 
It was first rumoured that Shakira may be the next guest on Bzrp Music Sessions in August 2022, when she wished Bizarrap a happy birthday on social media. The collaboration was confirmed by Bizarrap on social media on 10 January 2023. Despite the rumours, Rolling Stone wrote that Bizarrap's fans were disbelieving that Shakira was working with him.

Shakira and Gerard Piqué met in 2010 and began their relationship in 2011, having two children together. They separated in 2022. In 2021, Spanish authorities sought charges against Shakira, claiming that she should have paid income tax in Spain between 2012 and 2014 as she was in a relationship with Piqué and he lived in Barcelona, even though she maintains she did not.

In October 2022, Shakira released the song "Monotonía" about her and Piqué's break-up, a slow song focused on heartbreak and blaming monotony for the relationship ending. Her April 2022 song "Te Felicito", written in 2021 and released before the separation was announced, has also been said to be about the break-up.

Composition and lyrics 
Shakira worked with popular Latin music songwriter Keityn (Kevyn Cruz) on the track, having worked with him on her last two songs. Keityn said that after "Monotonía", Shakira wanted to write a more spiteful song, and the pair worked to create a song that neither went too far or was too soft for her.

When Shakira met with Keityn to work on the lyrics in her home studio in Barcelona, "she came with a list of everything she wanted to say." Keityn stated in an interview: "Shakira was the songwriter. [...] I merely helped her with rhyming."

The lyrics contain many references to Piqué and their relationship, with Shakira criticizing Piqué for his media scandals that saw her targeted; for moving his mother in next to their home; and for their relationship causing the Spanish treasury to seek her taxes. NPR Music wrote that the line referring to her ex as a "" could be referring to the ten-year age gap between Shakira and Piqué. The line "" references Shakira's 2009 song "Loba", while intentional pauses in the words "" and "" emphasise "clara" and "pique", referring to Piqué and his new girlfriend, Clara Chía. In an interview on The Tonight Show Starring Jimmy Fallon on March 10, 2023, Shakira revealed that the beat and instrumentals for the track were inspired by English electronic band Depeche Mode and their "dark undertone."

Release and promotion 
On 9 January 2023, a small plane flew over Mar del Plata and Miami, carrying a banner with the words "" and hinting at a release on 11 January. After the song was confirmed the next day, people responded by speculating what Shakira may sing; Billboard noted that Bizarrap's music sessions typically featured rappers "who don't hold back taking aim at something or someone". Some lyrics that were leaked on 10 January indicated that the song would be about Shakira's break-up with Piqué.

Independent label Dale Play Records sent "Shakira: Bzrp Music Sessions, Vol. 53" to US rhythmic contemporary radio and US contemporary hit radio on January 24, 2023.

Music video 
Bizarrap's 53rd music session, serving as the official music video, was released on 11 January 2023. In it, Shakira performs the song in a teal-tinted studio with Bizarrap producing the song in the background. Straying from realism in part, the music video features animation that depicts Shakira and her microphone as rough pencil drawings, paying homage to the music video of "Take On Me". The animation was created by Julia Conde, who said "Take On Me" is her favourite music video.

The video was viewed over 50.3 million times within its first 24 hours of release, breaking the record for biggest debut for a Latin song in YouTube history "by some distance". During one 24-hour period in its first week, the video was watched over 82million times, which broke the viewing record for a new Latin song. On 13 January 2023, in its third day of being available, it became the fastest Latin music video to reach 100million views on the platform.

Response and impact

Critical reception 
Critics' reviews of the song praised the lyrics and celebrated Shakira and Bizarrap for the overall composition, particularly in giving Shakira a new place in modern music. Several reviews highlighted the popular response to the song, which was largely supportive of Shakira and her decision to take revenge on Piqué through song.

A review in The Telegraph felt the song was massively effective as a pop song both in sound and in lyrically capturing an audience, saying "never has a pop song been so catchy and practical in near equal measure." Ximena N. Beltran Quan Kiu for CNN also praised the catchy lyrics, saying the song is "a formidable addition to the canon of breakup songs" and a public reminder of Shakira's quality. Also reflecting on the years Shakira spent without releasing major music since her 2017 album El Dorado, her career taking a backseat to supporting Piqué, NPR Music announced that "Shakira's himbo era is over." It called the song a "hard relaunch" for her career, with Bizarrap's production suggesting she is "on the hunt for a new, more relevant sound to reclaim her place in pop music." Feeling that the song does not have the same impact as her previous electronic hit, "She Wolf", NPR still felt it was successful, with Shakira's bravery to try a new sound paying off. BrooklynVegan agreed, emphasizing the potential for massive popularity with Shakira's "vocals [being] as iconic as ever" and Bizarrap "[giving] the song a modern and hard-hitting edge". Rolling Stone also asserted that the quality of the song would bring Shakira and her established superstardom back into public consciousness, with Suzy Exposito in the Los Angeles Times saying that the track would likely launch Bizarrap to fame in the United States due to this.

Commercial performance

Streaming figures 
The song reached the number one spot on iTunes in multiple countries within 24 hours of being available, including: Spain, Mexico, Italy and the US. The song debuted at number one on Spotify's Daily Global 200 chart, breaking the record for the highest debut for a Spanish song. It was also the fifth-highest Spotify debut of all time, with 14.39million streams in its first day. It was also achieved new records as the most-streamed song on its second day of release, and most-streamed song on its third day of release, with 13.69million and 12.86million streams on the platform for those days respectively. The song has also broken the record of the most streamed song of a single day in Spain (3.94 million), Mexico (3.83 million), Argentina (1.46 million), Colombia, Costa Rica, Panama, Peru, Ecuador, Chile, Bolivia, Paraguay, Venezuela and Uruguay.

Chart performance 
In under two days of tracking the song debuted on the Billboard Latin Digital Song Sales chart, debuting at number one. It was Bizarrap's first and Shakira's thirteenth number one, breaking her tie with Bad Bunny as the sole artist with the most number ones on the chart's history. Already having the most top ten Latin Pop Airplay hits among female artists, the song impacting this chart extending Shakira's record in this respect to 39. The song was a huge success in Latin America, debuting at number one in Colombia, Panama and Peru. It also reached the top ten in eleven other countries, including Argentina, Bolivia, Costa Rica, Chile, Ecuador and Mexico.

The song has earned her four Guinness World Records streaming wise - 
 Most viewed Latin track on YouTube in 24 hours
 Fastest Latin track to reach 100 million views on YouTube	
 Most streamed Latin track on Spotify in 24 hours	
 Most streamed Latin track on Spotify in one week	

In Spain, the song topped the Promusicae weekly charts after only one day of tracking and was certified platinum after eight tracking days. It also reached number one in Italy, the top twenty in Ireland and Lithuania; the top forty in Germany and the United Kingdom; and the top fifty in Sweden and the Netherlands, becoming Bizarrap's breakthrough hit in Europe. It's also her first top 10 on the Billboard Hot 100 since "Beautiful Liar" in 2007, reaching number 9 on the chart. The song became the first Spanish single by a female vocalist that peaked at top 10 on the chart which earned her a Guinness World Record.

Reactions

Pop culture 

The song received positive reactions from many Latin music artists on social media, and within a day of its release Shakira's name was trending on Twitter at number one worldwide, with around 2.5 million tweets. Communications specialist Ximena N. Beltran Quan Kiu found that the song served as a "significant cultural statement", that Shakira refusing to feel shame for the end of her relationship was rejecting "societal expectations and pressures to behave in a certain way" as a woman. She suggested that this was the reason for its popularity, with people discussing Shakira's method of statement on social media also driving engagement. Other media wrote that one popular line in the song, gaining lots of engagement, was the hook "", embodying the empowering message; BIMM Institute lecturer Martin Wright also highlighted the line "", which he said managed to "impressively" in one line convey multiple break-up song elements, including those used in songs both about being the one to end the relationship and the one getting left.

Other related phrases also trended on Twitter, including "RIP Piqué", "Clara Chía", "Casio" and "Rolex"; when the companies Casio and Renault, each having products mentioned in the song, started trending worldwide, both appeared to react to the song in their own posts. However the official Twitter account of Casio refuted these claims and reminded people to look out for fake accounts. The official Twitter account of the European Union Intellectual Property Office also responded on Twitter, with a joke about the line "".

It quickly had an impact outside of music. According to Google Trends, searches for Twingo and Casio reached five-year highs worldwide, with Launchmetrics data showing that during the first week of the song's release, Casio and Rolex gained $70million and $40.5million respectively in media exposure across print, online content, and social media. Spanish media dubbed the fiscal impact ""; also affecting Ferrari, this company saw its share value rise 2.08% due to the positive mention in the song, while Casio had a 1.87% decrease in value and Renault a 1.45% decrease, with both being mentioned negatively. It soon became noted that the Shakira effect, as a phenomenon of social influence, may have seen the stock values of the brands mentioned negatively decrease, but also saw the social value of the brands increase; social media insights firm Audiense showed that besides social media mentions dramatically increasing for Casio, many of these were positive, including some social media users discussing a nostalgic affection for the brand, provoked by the song. On 23 January, the Marketing Director of Casio said "thanks to "the Shakira effect," the sales have been spectacular... [and] intense. But the best thing is every day [sales] are much better than last year."

Croatian The Bridge MP Nino Raspudić used the lyrics as referents to convey a political message on 17 January at the session of the Croatian Parliament that saw Šime Erlić elected to succeed Nataša Tramišak as Minister of Regional Development and EU Funds, with Raspudić saying: "we could say that the two most dangerous women in the world right now are Tramišak and Shakira, and by electing Erlić you gave us a Twingo instead of a Ferrari." Senator and former Italian Prime Minister Matteo Renzi made a reference to the song’s lyrics to convey a political message during an electoral event on 5 February leading up to the upcoming regional elections: "As they say in contemporary philosophy, they had a Ferrari and they traded it for a Twingo".

University of Cambridge lecturer Dr Maya Feile Tomes wrote a letter published in The Guardian, criticizing how the song espoused a feminist message but was "disappointingly sexist" by the way it demeans and judges the new girlfriend in the lyrics, something Feile Tomes felt was unnecessary. A CNN op-ed by author and communications specialist Ximena N. Beltran Quan Kiu instead felt that Shakira's lyrics were welcomely raw about all the things that were hurting her or keeping her up at night, including the cheating in which the new girlfriend was complicit, and her insecurity compared to younger women; Beltran Quan Kiu did note that among the popular responses were social media users "questioning whether Shakira broke an unwritten rule between women by dragging her ex's new flame".

Shakira and Piqué 
In the days after the song's release, Gerard Piqué acknowledged it in various affronted ways. He turned up for a recording for his Kings League (a seven-a-side football league created by Piqué and participated in by former footballers and streamers) show in a Twingo, and pointed out on the show that he was wearing a Casio watch, also claiming to have sponsorship from the company. Casio later denied having any ties to or plans to sponsor Piqué or the Kings League. It was reported in Spanish tabloids that Chía, who is also targeted in the song, was stressed and scared to leave her house because of its popularity. It was reported that Clara hired professional help after the track, because people would stop her and sing it to her on the streets. According to journalists close to Gerard Piqué, Clara Chia was admitted to a hospital in Barcelona after suffering from anxiety attacks. Piqué was booed at Esland Awards in Mexico with the crowd repeatedly chanting Shakira's name.

In thanking fans for their support on Instagram in the days after the release of the song, Shakira wrote that the song "was a catharsis" for herself, and she was happy it had become an anthem for other women going through break-ups or being made to feel insignificant, also thanking fans for having her go straight to number one "at 45 years old and in Spanish". On 14 January, Shakira put up a model of a witch on her balcony, facing Piqué mother's home, and played the song at full volume on repeat. The next day, after Shakira had turned off the song, fans gathered in the street outside Shakira's home and started singing and dancing to the track.

Catalan political strategist Xavier Dominguez wrote an op-ed listicle on "new social media" platform El Principal, saying that out of Shakira and Piqué, the latter would benefit much more from the song's release overall, saying that Shakira's larger profile is not raised by it but Piqué's is, and that football fans do not care enough about adultery to be affected; Dominguez felt that Piqué would be able to market the attention better than Shakira. Dominguez also suggested that the popularity of the song turned Piqué into an underdog that people may root for, while turning Shakira into a villain due to what he said was talking about the break-up so much it was almost laughable.

Academic studies 
El Tiempo reported that, after a week of release, it was part of a study at the National Autonomous University of Mexico as a subject of analysis by gender studies experts. Educators are studying symbolism in its lyrics from the point of view of gender violence.

Legacy and records 
The song broke 14 Guinness World Records, on March 10, Bizarrap and Shakira were presented with 4 records in New York City. Shakira was further awarded 10 additional awards for records she broke with the success of the session.

The records broken by the song are:
- Most streamed Latin track on Spotify in 24 hours (14,393,324 streams)
- Most viewed Latin track on YouTube in 24 hours (63,000,000 hits)
- Fastest Latin track to reach 100 million views on YouTube (two days and approximately 22 hours)
- Most streamed Latin track on Spotify in one week (80,646,962)

Further records Shakira achieved with the song:
- First female vocalist to debut in the Top 10 of the Billboard Hot 100 with a Spanish-language track
- Most No. 1s on Billboard's Latin Airplay chart by a female artist
- First female artist to replace herself at No. 1 on Billboard's Latin Airplay chart
- Most cumulative weeks at No. 1 on Billboard's Hot Latin Songs chart by a female artist
- Most Top 10 hits on Billboard's Hot Latin Songs chart by a female artist
- Most Top 10 hits on Billboard's Latin Airplay chart by a female artist
- Most No. 1s on Billboard's Latin Pop Airplay chart by a female artist
- Most Top 10 hits on Billboard's Latin Pop Airplay chart by a female artist
- Most No. 1s on Billboard's Latin Digital Song Sales chart
- Most Billboard charts topped by a Spanish-language track by a female artist

Live performances 
Bizarrap and Shakira performed the song live for the first time on March 10, 2023 on The Tonight Show Starring Jimmy Fallon. The performance likewise was a viral hit on the internet. Viewers praising Shakira's boldness and the audience interaction with the song. Four days after the performance, TheWrap revealed it had scored more than 156 million views across social media platforms including TikTok, Instagram, Facebook, YouTube and Twitter making it one of the most-viewed performances on The Tonight Show.

Charts

Monthly charts

Certifications

Release history

See also 

 List of best-selling singles in Spain
 List of Billboard Argentina Hot 100 number-one singles of 2023
 List of Billboard Argentina Hot 100 top-ten singles in 2023
 List of Billboard Hot 100 top-ten singles in 2023
 List of Billboard Latin Pop Airplay number ones of 2023
 List of Billboard Hot Latin Songs and Latin Airplay number ones of 2023
 List of top 10 singles in 2023 (France)
 List of number-one hits of 2023 (Italy)
 List of number-one singles of 2023 (Spain)

Notes

References

External links 
 

2023 singles
2023 songs
Bizarrap songs
Shakira songs
Diss tracks
Number-one singles in Italy
Number-one singles in Spain
Song recordings produced by Bizarrap
Songs written by Shakira
Electropop songs
Songs about infidelity
Viral videos